The 20-gun French corvette Hussard (or Hussar) was launched in 1799 and the British captured her that same year when they captured Suriname. The Dutch captured her in 1803, naming her Suriname, but the British recaptured her in 1807 and sent her to Britain. Thereafter she never again served on active duty. She disappeared from the Navy lists in 1809, but her fate is unknown.

Capture
On 20 August 1799, a British force under the command of Lieutenant-General Thomas Trigge and Vice Admiral the Right Honourable Lord Hugh Seymour captured the Dutch colony of Suriname. Among the various items of booty was the French corvette Hussar. Eventually, Hussar surrendered to the Americans, who removed her crew. Shortly thereafter the British arrived and captured Suriname. The Americans agreed that the British had rights to Hussar herself as she had been in inland waters upon the surrender of Suriname. (The British also captured the Dutch brig-sloop Kemphaan, which they took into service under the name Camphaan.) The letter reporting the corvette's capture describes her as "The French Corvette L'Hussar, a very fine Vessel, only Seven Months old; mounts Twenty Nine-Pounders".

British service
Surinam then served on the Leeward Islands station. Over the period from late March to early April 1800 Cole captured two French privateers and recaptured a merchant schooner. First, on 24 March, he captured the sloop Consolateur, of one gun and 35 men. She had left Point-à-Pitre, Guadeloupe on a cruise. Second, two days later he captured the sloop Renard, of three guns and 15 men. She too had left Point-à-Pitre. Lastly, on 3 April he recaptured the schooner Lack.

Cole also introduced new regulations aboard his ship that kept his men in good health in the Caribbean Sea. In 1801, Seymour died from a fever, but Cole's activities had already been noticed by Sir John Thomas Duckworth who replaced Seymour and Cole was made a post captain on 30 June 1801 in Duckworth's flagship . Cole's replacement was Lieutenant Randall MacDonnell. His replacement, in 1803, was Commander Robert Tucker (acting).

Commodore Sir Samuel Hood sent Tucker and Surinam on a mission to Saint-Domingue to try to secure the release of two British officers reportedly in the hands of the rebels at Gonaïves. On discovering that one of the officers had already been executed and that the other had escaped, Tucker then sailed to Jacmel, where he assisted the besieged French garrison. Two days after leaving Jacmel, Surinam sustained damage and Tucker then put in at Curaçao for repairs.

Capture by the Dutch
While Tucker was at St Anna Bay, Curaçao, the Dutch found out, from a prize that Tucker had sent to Jamaica for news and that had returned, that war had been declared between Britain and Holland. The Dutch then seized Tucker and Surinam on 23 June, despite Tucker's best efforts to escape. The Dutch first released Surinams crew, and then Tucker and his officers, in hopes of an exchange of prisoners. Tucker himself spent some four months in close confinement in a dungeon. At his subsequent court-martial, Tucker was acquitted of all blame for the loss. However, the court-martial did reprimand Tucker for unofficerlike conduct in his dealings with the Dutch authorities. It ordered him to be put at the bottom of the list of Commanders; thereafter he never again was employed in the Royal Navy.

The Dutch took Surinam into service as Suriname.

Recapture and fate

The Dutch resisted, and Suriname suffered five men wounded, including her captain, Jan Van Ness; one of the wounded died later. The British described her as having 22 guns. Her captain, Cornelius J. Evertz, had also commanded the Dutch naval force in Curaçao. In 1847 the Admiralty authorized the issue of the Naval General Service Medal with clasp "Curacoa 1 Jany. 1807" to the 65 surviving claimants from the action. Captain Charles Brisbane, captain of Arethusa and commander of the squadron, also received a gold medal.

In February 1807 Commander Henry Higman was appointed to command Surinam on the Jamaica station. Towards the end of the year he sailed her back to Britain. Some records suggest that Suriname was later renamed Sasnarang, the Navy having already commissioned another Surinam. A more likely name is Samarang, Sir Edward Pellew in Psyche having captured several Dutch vessels at Samarang in August. Surinam (or Samarang or Sasnarang) saw no further active service. She remained on the Navy lists until 1809, but her eventual disposition is unknown.

Notes

Citations

References
 
 
 
 

1799 ships
Sloops of the Royal Navy
Captured ships
Ships built in France